Beatrice Roach Gottlieb (April 15, 1919 – October 8, 2011) was an American politician who served as the Secretary of State of New Mexico from 1951 to 1954.

She was raised in Mountainair, New Mexico. In 1950, she declared her candidacy for the office of secretary of state. Then known as Beatrice Bassett Roach, she first took office at the age of 32, and was the youngest person in the United States to serve as a secretary of state at the time. Gottlieb's second term ended in 1954, and she was succeeded by Natalie Smith Buck. Gottlieb ran for a third term in 1957, but lost to Betty Fiorina.

References

Secretaries of State of New Mexico
New Mexico Democrats
Women in New Mexico politics
1919 births
2011 deaths
People from Torrance County, New Mexico
20th-century American politicians
20th-century American women politicians
21st-century American women